The following are the association football events of the year 1990 throughout the world.

Events 
 March 28 – Sweden's Bo Johansson makes his debut as the manager of Iceland, defeating Luxembourg 2–1.
March 31 – NAC Breda sacks manager Hans Verèl.
May 16 – Juventus win the two-legged 1990 UEFA Cup Final, beating fellow Italian side Fiorentina 3–1 on aggregate. This was the first European competition final between two Italian clubs.
May 17 – Manchester United beats Crystal Palace 1–0 in a replay to claim the FA Cup. The only goal is scored by Lee Martin.
May 23 – Milan beats Benfica 1–0 in the 1990 European Cup Final. The only goal is scored by Frank Rijkaard.
July 8 – West Germany wins the 1990 FIFA World Cup in Rome, Italy, defeating defending reigning champions Argentina 1–0 in the final.
September 8 – Franz Beckenbauer is appointed manager at Marseille.
September 12 – Euro 1992 qualifying: there are great surprises at Landskrona, Sweden, where the Faroe Islands, in their first competitive international match, defeat Austria 1–0. It is the "Waterloo Day" in Austrian football, and national happiness day for Faroes.
September 12 – East Germany plays its last ever international match, defeating Belgium 2–0 in Brussels.
September 19 – Dutch team Vitesse Arnhem makes its European debut with a win (1–0) in Northern Ireland against Derry City in the first round of the UEFA Cup. The only goal is scored by striker Huub Loeffen in the 18th minute.
October 10 – Copa Libertadores 1990 is won by Olimpia Asunción after defeating Barcelona Sporting Club on an aggregate score of 3–1.
October 17 – Croatia host their first match in the modern period after gaining independence from Yugoslavia, a friendly against United States in Zagreb. Croatia wins 2–1, and the first goal for the Croats in the modern era is scored by Aljoša Asanović.
November 5 – Manager Howard Kendall is fired by Manchester City and succeeded by Peter Reid.
December 9 – Milan again wins the Intercontinental Cup in Tokyo, this time by defeating Paraguay's Olimpia Asunción (3–0). Frank Rijkaard scores twice for the Italians.

Winners of national championships

Asia
AFC Champions League

1990-91

 – Esteghlal as Winner 

 China– Liaoning F.C. as Runners Up

Europe
  – Dinamo Tirana
  – Swarovski Tirol
  – Club Brugge
  – CSKA Sofia
  – APOEL
  – Sparta Prague
  – Brøndby
  – Dynamo Dresden
  – Liverpool
  – Marseille
  – Panathinaikos
  – Újpest
  – St Patrick's Athletic
  – Napoli
  – Avenir Beggen
  – Valletta
 
Eredivisie – Ajax
Eerste Divisie – SVV
  – Portadown
  – Rosenborg
  – Lech Poznań
  – Porto
  – Dinamo București
  For more complete coverage see: 1989–90 in Scottish football.
Scottish Premier Division – Rangers
Scottish Division One – St. Johnstone
Scottish Division Two – Brechin City
Scottish Cup – Aberdeen
Scottish League Cup – Aberdeen
  Dynamo Kyiv
  – Real Madrid
  – IFK Göteborg
  Grasshopper Club Zürich
  – Beşiktaş
  – Bayern Munich
  – Red Star Belgrade

North America
 – Vancouver 86ers (CSL)
 – Puebla
 – Maryland Bays (APSL)

South America
 – River Plate
 – Oriente Petrolero
 – Corinthians
 Paraguay – Cerro Porteño

International Tournaments 
 African Cup of Nations in Algeria (March 2 – 16 1990)
 
 
 
 FIFA World Cup in Italy (June 8 – July 8, 1990)

Births

January
 January 1 — Al Naem Mohamed Osman Al Noor, Sudanese footballer
 January 2 — Maurício Alves Peruchi, Brazilian footballer (d. 2014)
 January 3
Yoichiro Kakitani, Japanese footballer
Maximilian Karner, Austrian footballer
 January 4
Iago Falque, Spanish footballer
Alberto Paloschi, Italian footballer
 January 5 — Leroy Fer, Dutch international footballer
 January 8 
Sascha Bigalke, German footballer
Hassan Adhuham, Maldivian footballer
 January 15 — Fernando Forestieri, Italian footballer
 January 20 — Tales, Brazilian footballer
 January 23
 Şener Özbayraklı, Turkish international 
 Martyn Waghorn, English youth international

February
 February 5 — Dalton, Brazilian footballer
 February 9 — Facundo Affranchino, Argentine footballer
 February 12 — Hamilton Chasi, Ecuadorian footballer
 February 13
Marco Romizi, Italian footballer
Mamadou Sakho, French footballer
Kevin Strootman, Dutch footballer
 February 15 — Fidel Martínez, Ecuadorian footballer
 February 18
 David Guzmán, Costa Rican footballer
 Bryan Oviedo, Costa Rican footballer
 February 23 — Terry Hawkridge, English footballer
 February 25 — Rafael Romo, Venezuelan footballer

March
 March 9 — Christian La Torre, Peruvian footballer
 March 19
Anthony Skorich, Australian soccer player
Jonathan Urretavizcaya, Uruguayan footballer
 March 21 — Sharif Mukhammad, Afghan football player
 March 27 — Jefferson Pinto, Ecuadorian footballer

April
 April 19
 Héctor Herrera, Mexican footballer
 Damien Le Tallec, French footballer
 Patrick Wiegers, German footballer
 April 27 — Luís Pedro, Dutch-Angolan footballer

May
 May 2 — Daniel Sánchez, Peruvian footballer
 May 19 — Víctor Ibarbo, Colombian footballer
 May 4 —David Hasler, Liechtenstein footballer
 May 24 — Anderson Cueto, Peruvian footballer
 May 24 — Ricardo Chará, Colombian footballer
 May 27 — Jonas Hector, German international footballer

June
 June 1
 Miller Bolaños, Ecuadoran international
 Kennie Chopart, Danish club footballer
 Martin Pembleton, club footballer
 June 21 — François Moubandje, Cameroonian-Swiss footballer
 June 22 — Kyrylo Petrov, Ukrainian football defender
 June 24 — Kelvin Leerdam, Dutch footballer

July
 July 1 — Ángelo Balanta, Colombian footballer
 July 15 — Michael Castro, Ecuadorian footballer
 July 22 — Anaqi Sufi Omar Baki, Bruneian footballer
 July 25 —  Carlos Carbonero, Colombian international footballer

August
 August 8 — Abel Hernández, Uruguayan footballer
 August 11 — Lerin Duarte, Dutch footballer
 August 13 — Cristian Nazarith, Colombian footballer
 August 23 — Reimond Manco, Peruvian footballer

September
 September 8 — Néstor Duarte, Peruvian footballer
 September 14 — Douglas Costa, Brazilian footballer
 September 14 — Santiago García, Uruguayan footballer
 September 18 — Mauricio Arroyo, Colombian footballer
 September 19 — Ernesto Salazar, Peruvian footballer
 September 19 — Marco Pérez, Colombian footballer

October
 October 1
 Jan Kirchhoff, German footballer
 Pedro Filipe Mendes, Portuguese footballer
 Albert Prosa, Estonian footballer
 October 27 — Deison Méndez, Ecuadorian footballer

November
 November 9 — James Harper, English club footballer
 November 11 — Georginio Wijnaldum, Dutch footballer

December
 December 2
 Emmanuel Agyemang-Badu, Ghanaian footballer
 Jamille Matt, Jamaican footballer 
 Gastón Ramírez, Uruguayan footballer
 December 7 — Rafael Uiterloo, Dutch footballer
 December 12 — Pablo Camacho, Venezuelan footballer
 December 27 — Luis Trujillo, Peruvian footballer
 December 28 — Marcos Alonso, Spanish footballer

Deaths

January
 January 15 – David Longhurst, English footballer. (born 1965)

March
 March 20 – Lev Yashin, Soviet international footballer (born 1929)

April
 April 1 – Carlos Peucelle, Argentine midfielder, runner-up of the 1930 FIFA World Cup and considered one of Argentina's finest wingers in their history. (81)
 April 17 – Angelo Schiavio, Italian striker, winner of the 1934 FIFA World Cup and topscorer of the 1931–32 Serie A . (84)
 April 30 – Mario Pizziolo, Italian midfielder, winner of the 1934 FIFA World Cup. (80)

May
 May 1 – Djalma Dias, Brazilian defender, 21 times capped for the Brazil national football team. (50)

July
 July 16 – Miguel Muñoz, Spanish midfielder, Captin of Real Madrid when they were European Champions in 1956 and 1957. (68)
 July 21 – Heitor Canalli, Brazilian midfielder, Brazilian squad member at the 1934 FIFA World Cup. (83)

October
 October 25 – Costa Pereira, Portuguese international footballer (born 1929)
 October 30 – Willy Jürissen, German international footballer (born 1912)

November
 November 11 – Attilio Demaría, Argentine/Italian striker, winner of the 1934 FIFA World Cup. Demaria has the distinction of having played in two FIFA World Cup final matches with two different national teams. (81)

December
 December 24 – Rodolfo Orlandini, Argentine midfielder, runner-up of the 1930 FIFA World Cup. (85)

References

External links
  Rec.Sport.Soccer Statistics Foundation
  VoetbalStats

 
Association football by year